Blenkiron is a surname. Notable people with the surname include:

 Alfred Blenkiron (1896–1920), British World War I flying ace
 Florence Blenkiron (1904–1991), British motorcycle racer
 John S. Blenkiron, fictional character
 William Blenkiron ( 1807–1871), English racehorse breeder